The 1934 PGA Championship was the 17th PGA Championship, held July 24–29 at Park Country Club in Williamsville, New York, a suburb northeast of Buffalo. Then a match play championship, Paul Runyan won the first of his two PGA Championship titles, defeating Craig Wood in 38 holes.

Defending champion Gene Sarazen lost 4 & 3 in the second round to Al Watrous.

Format
The match play format at the PGA Championship in 1934 called for 12 rounds (216 holes) in six days:
 Tuesday – 36-hole stroke play qualifier
defending champion Gene Sarazen and top 31 professionals advanced to match play
 Wednesday – first round – 36 holes 
 Thursday – second round – 36 holes 
 Friday – quarterfinals – 36 holes 
 Saturday – semifinals – 36 holes 
 Sunday – final – 36 holes

Past champions in the field

Failed to qualify

Source:

Final results
Sunday, July 29, 1934

Final eight bracket

Final match scorecards
Morning

Afternoon

Extra holes

Source:

References

External links
PGA Media Guide 2012
PGA.com – 1934 PGA Championship

PGA Championship
Golf in New York (state)
PGA Championship
PGA Championship
PGA Championship
PGA Championship